Shortridge's rat (Thallomys shortridgei) is a species of rodent in the family Muridae.
It is found only in South Africa.
Its natural habitat is subtropical or tropical dry shrubland.

References

Endemic fauna of South Africa
Thallomys
Mammals of South Africa
Mammals described in 1923
Taxa named by Oldfield Thomas
Taxa named by Martin Hinton
Taxonomy articles created by Polbot